KXUT-LP is a Country formatted low-power broadcast radio station licensed to and serving Logan, Utah.  KXUT-LP is owned and operated by Wasatch Radio.

References

External links
 Calf Country @ 101.7 Online
 

2015 establishments in Utah
Country radio stations in the United States
Radio stations established in 2015
XUT-LP
XUT-LP